7553 Buie, provisional designation , is a Nysa asteroid from the inner regions of the asteroid belt, approximately  in diameter. It was discovered on 30 March 1981, by American astronomer Edward Bowell at Lowell's Anderson Mesa Station near Flagstaff, Arizona. The stony S-type asteroid has a rotation period 4.2 hours an possibly an elongated shape. It was named after American astronomer Marc Buie.

Orbit and classification 

Buie is a core member of the Nysa family, also known as the Herta family, located within the Nysa–Polana complex. It is one of the largest asteroid families of the asteroid belt and named after 44 Nysa.

It orbits the Sun in the inner main-belt at a distance of 2.0–2.7 AU once every 3 years and 8 months (1,351 days; semi-major axis of 2.39 AU). Its orbit has an eccentricity of 0.15 and an inclination of 3° with respect to the ecliptic. A first precovery was taken at the Palomar Observatory in December 1950, extending the asteroid's observation arc by 31 years prior to its discovery.

Naming 

This minor planet was named in honor of American Marc William Buie (born 1958), an astronomer at the discovering Lowell Observatory and a prolific discoverer of minor planets including several trans-Neptunian objects. His contributions to planetary astronomy also include research on the moons of Pluto and the development of widely used astronomical software. The official naming citation was published by the Minor Planet Center on 28 July 1999.

Physical characteristics 

Buie has been characterized as a stony S-type asteroid by PanSTARRS photometric survey. It is also an S-type in the SDSS-based taxonomy, and agrees with the overall spectral type of the Nysa family.

Rotation period 

In September 2012, a rotational lightcurve of Buie was obtained from photometric observations made at the Palomar Transient Factory, California. In the R-band, it gave a rotation period of  hours with a brightness variation of 0.51 magnitude, while in the SG-Band the period was  hours with an amplitude of 0.53 magnitude. A high brightness variation typically indicates a non-spherical shape.

Diameter and albedo 

According to the survey carried out by the NEOWISE mission of NASA's Wide-field Infrared Survey Explorer, Buie measures 3.4 kilometers in diameter and its surface has an albedo of 0.259, while the Collaborative Asteroid Lightcurve Link assumes a standard albedo for stony asteroids of 0.20 and calculates a diameter of 3.92 kilometers using an absolute magnitude of 14.4.

References

External links 
 Asteroid Lightcurve Database (LCDB), query form (info )
 Dictionary of Minor Planet Names, Google books
 Discovery Circumstances: Numbered Minor Planets (5001)-(10000) – Minor Planet Center
 
 

007553
Discoveries by Edward L. G. Bowell
Named minor planets
19810330